Concord is an unincorporated community in Cherokee County, located in the U.S. state of Texas. According to the Handbook of Texas, the community had a population of 50 in 2000. It is located within the Tyler-Jacksonville combined statistical area.

History
The area in what is known as Concord today may have been settled by people from Concord, Massachusetts. It was also settled by a family from Tennessee around 1850. In the 1930s and 40s, mail was sent to the community from Jacksonville and then Troup. It had 20 residents served by only one business in 1930 and grew to have 50 residents, three churches, and another business the next decade. It had two churches and businesses and 97 families in 1987 and the population remained at 50 in 2000.

Geography

Education
Concord School was established in 1884 and joined the Carlisle Independent School District in 1948.

Notes

Unincorporated communities in Cherokee County, Texas
Unincorporated communities in Texas